The imitation of life in art is called mimesis.

Imitation of Life may also refer to:

Literature and film
Imitation of Life (novel), a 1933 novel by Fannie Hurst
Imitation of Life (1934 film), an adaptation of the novel starring Claudette Colbert
Imitation of Life (1959 film), an adaptation of the novel starring Lana Turner

Music
Imitation of Life, a 1981 album by Steve Beresford and Tristan Honsinger
"Imitation of Life", a song by Anthrax from the 1987 album Among the Living
"Imitation of Life" (song), a 2001 song by R.E.M. from Reveal
Imitations of Life, a 2004 album by the R&B group H-Town

See also
Imitation of Christ (disambiguation)